The Anglican Diocese of Ikwuano is one of nine within the Anglican Province of Aba, itself one of 14 provinces within the Church of Nigeria. The current bishop is Chigozirim Onyegbule

Notes

Church of Nigeria dioceses
Dioceses of the Province of Aba